Choman may refer to:

Choman (city), a city in the Arbil Governorate in the Kurdistan region of Iraq
Choman District, a district in Erbil Province, Iraq
Choman Hardi (born 1974), contemporary Kurdish poet, translator and painter